Sverris saga is one of the Kings' sagas. Its subject is King Sverre Sigurdsson of Norway (r. 1177–1202) and it is the main source for this period of Norwegian history. As the foreword tells us, the saga in its final form consists of more than one part. Work first began in 1185 under the king’s direct supervision. It is not known when it was finished, but presumably it was well known when Snorri Sturluson began writing his Heimskringla in the 1220s since Snorri ends his account where Sverris saga begins. Thus the saga is contemporary or near-contemporary with the events it describes. The saga is obviously written by someone sympathetic to Sverre’s cause, but the strict demands of the genre ensure some degree of impartiality.

Authorship and composition
The first distinct part of the saga is called Grýla and describes the events until the aftermath of Sverre's first major victory at the Battle of Kalvskinnet (slaget på Kalvskinnet)  outside Nidaros in 1179. Central to this part is Sverre's claim to be the son of King Sigurd Munn and his struggle against his rival claimant Magnus Erlingsson. According to the foreword, Grýla was written by Karl Jónsson, the Abbot from Þingeyrar monastery in the north of Iceland. Karl Jónsson is known to have visited Norway from 1185 to c. 1188. Sverre is supposed to have served as Grýla’s main source and decided what should be written. The Saga ends at Sverre's death in 1202 and was completed afterwards, perhaps by Karl Jónsson as well.

Style
Grýla is written in a unique style that to some degree seems to be inspired by the long medieval tradition of hagiography. The style and focus of Sverris saga is very unlike that of the earlier Norwegian synoptics. Instead of narrowly focusing on the king and major events of state, Sverris saga is a detailed and rich biography with a large cast of characters, elaborate scenes and dialogue. The saga is the most detailed in the depiction of the many battles Sverre led to win and retain the monarchy in the country, The saga is particularly detailed when it comes to Sverre's speeches, as well as his battles and military strategy.

References

Other sources
Jakobsson, Ármann (2005) Royal Biography, in A Companion to Old Norse-Icelandic Literature and Culture  (Rory McTurk, ed. Wiley-Blackwell)

External links
Sverris saga in English translation by J. Stephton
Sverris saga in Norges Kongesagaer
Saga Sverris konúngs in Old Norse
Proverbs and proverbial materials in Sverris saga konungs

 
Kings' sagas